Tsotyli (also Τσοτίλι - Tsotili) is a village and a former municipality, now part of the Voio municipality. Before the 2011 local government reform it was the seat of the municipality of Tsotyli. The municipal unit has an area of 330.269 km2, the community 25.658 km2. The 2011 census recorded 1,545 residents in the village and 3,417 residents in the municipal unit of Tsotyli. It is a famous western Greek area, especially known for its old housing estate (oikotrofeio). The Archeological Museum of Tsotili is notable as well.

Nearby
Starting from Tsotyli, you may visit Apidea, of archaeological interest, in the location of Boufara or Saint Athanasios. The picturesque villages of Krimini and Rodochori are situated a few kilometres away from Tsotyli. Near the village of Rodochori, the Tsoukaris bridge over Pramoritsa, a tributary of Aliakmon, bears witness to the local architecture. The Tsotyli-Kastanochoria route is unique. The mountain Ontria, with its forests, fresh water springs and old legends about girls who turned into stone, looms over the area. The village of Polikastano has an amazing landscape at an altitude of 950m. In the mountainous Voio, the village of Avgerinos (Αυγερινος), at an altitude of 1050m. completes the beauty of the landscape. The mastery of the old craftsmen of the village is shown in the two floor houses made of stone in the central square. Following a dirt road you may visit the monastery of Aghia Triada (Holy Trinity) on the outskirts of Vithos and Pentalofos.

See also
 List of settlements in the Kozani regional unit

References

Populated places in Kozani (regional unit)
Former municipalities in Western Macedonia